The 1970 United States Senate election in Maryland took place on November 3, 1970. Incumbent Democratic U.S. Senator Joseph Tydings ran for re-election to a second term, but was narrowly defeated by Republican U.S. Representative J. Glenn Beall Jr.

Tydings had defeated Beall's father, Senator James Glenn Beall six years earlier. Tydings's own adoptive father Millard had served as senator as well as Beall Sr., making this a rare dynastic election between the sons of former senators.

, this was the last time the Republicans won the Class 1 Senate seat in Maryland.

Democratic primary

Candidates
Walter Gilchrist Finch, Baltimore patent lawyer
George P. Mahoney, nominee for Governor in 1966
Joseph Tydings, incumbent Senator
Charles D. White

Results

Republican primary

Candidates
J. Glenn Beall Jr., U.S. Representative from Frostburg and son of former Senator J. Glenn Beall Sr.
Wainwright Dawson
Harry L. Simms

Results

Results

Results by county

Counties that flipped from Democrat to Republican
Anne Arundel
Baltimore (County)
Calvert
Caroline
Cecil
Charles
Frederick
Harford
Howard
Kent
Queen Anne's
St. Mary's
Talbot
Washington
Wicomico

See also
1970 United States Senate elections
1970 United States elections

References

Notes

1970
Maryland
United States Senate